Flight Laboratory, IIT Kanpur is an airstrip/aerodrome located inside IIT Kanpur's campus at Kalyanpur 18 kilometres west of city of Kanpur, India. It is used by the Aerospace Engineering department of IIT Kanpur. Pawan Hans began a helicopter ferry service to Lucknow from June 2013, which later shut down silently.

History
IIT Kanpur received collaborative technical assistance from a consortium of nine leading US universities when it was being set up. Considering the intense research potentials and rapid growth in the field of aviation at that time, it was decided to establish the faculty of Aeronautical Engineering at IIT Kanpur. Under the USAID educational assistance project, an all-weather 884x61 m small airstrip was set up with a Flight Laboratory. The Lab was equipped with Piper PA-18 and Cessna 182 powered aircraft and Schweizer 2-22 and Schweizer 1-26 gliders. A Rohini glider, designed and developed at Technical Center of Civil Aviation Department and manufactured at HAL, was the jewel in the crown of the Flight Lab. The open cockpit, side-by-side seating, fabric covered wooden structure glider became very popular among students and used extensively for research work. Soon the Flight Lab. swung into action and the gliders were aero-towed to desired heights with students on board for the complex studies of aerodynamics and flight mechanics.

The glider flying programme was an instant hit with the students of IIT Kanpur. Due to the massive response, membership was restricted to a number of selected students. You could see them beeline for the Center immediately after their classes. The intense heat of summer or the extreme cold of winter could not deter them from that one more flight. The excitement of positive- and negative- 'G's, long soaring flights or a first solo provided a special thrill and were keenly awaited. Soaring flights of over five hours and altitudes over 10,000 feet became common events. Many students who were unable to become members became frequent visitors for joyrides. The campus residents were not to be left far behind, and visited the centre with family and friends to lose the feel of being earth-bound.

See also
 List of airports by ICAO code: V#VA VE VI VO - India
 List of airports in India
 IIT Kanpur#Laboratories and other facilities
 Kanpur Airport

References

External links
 Gliding Club, IIT Kanpur

Transport in Uttar Pradesh
IIT Kanpur
University and college airports
Educational institutions in India with year of establishment missing
Airstrips in India